BCD Group (formerly BCD Holdings N.V.) is a privately owned Dutch company and consists of BCD Travel (global corporate travel management and its subsidiaries BCD Meetings & Events, global meetings and events agency, and Advito, global business travel consultancy), and Park 'N Fly (off-airport parking). Founded in 1975 by John Fentener van Vlissingen, BCD Group employs more than 10,000 people and operates in 100+ countries.

History
In 1976, van Vlissingen left his job at Pierson, Heldring & Pierson to focus exclusively on his company, which opened an office in Atlanta that year and changed its name to Noro Management Inc. BCD became deeply involved in real estate development in the Atlanta metro area, including shopping malls and office complexes.

In 1986, in anticipation of diversification, Noro was spun off and the remaining company was renamed BCD Holdings N.V. The company entered the travel industry in 1987 with the acquisition of WorldTravel Advisors, an Atlanta-based travel management company, and of off-airport parking operation Park 'N Fly in 1988.

At the beginning of 2006, TUI AG sold its subsidiary TQ3 Travel Solutions Management Holding GmbH to BCD Holdings N.V. (operating as BCD Group since 2014), which merged the three companies World Travel BTI, The Travel Company and TQ3 Travel Solutions under the name BCD Travel.

References

External links
 

Privately held companies of the Netherlands
Travel management
Holding companies of the Netherlands
Companies based in Utrecht (province)
Utrecht (province)
Holding companies established in 1975
Dutch companies established in 1975